Dato' Shamshulkahar bin Mohd. Deli is a Malaysian politician and served as Negeri Sembilan State Executive Councillor.

Election results

Honours 
  :
  Knight Commander of the Order of Loyalty to Negeri Sembilan (DPNS) – Dato' (2010)

References

United Malays National Organisation politicians
Members of the Negeri Sembilan State Legislative Assembly
Negeri Sembilan state executive councillors
21st-century Malaysian politicians
Living people
People from Negeri Sembilan
Malaysian people of Malay descent
Malaysian Muslims
1961 births